Etian(倚天) is a given name for male. It means strong, powerful and supported by the heaven.  It originated from a famous sword called Etian Sword (i.e. Heaven Sword), which was once owned by Cao Cao (曹操) of the Three Kingdoms period (三国时代). The name is further publicized by a well known Chinese story "Etian Tulong Ji' (Heaven Sword and Dragon Sabre or 倚天屠龙记).

Gender: Masculine

Other Scripts: 倚天 (Chinese)

Origin: Chinese

Pronounced: /i-'tyan/

References

Given names